Alberto Tiberti (born August 10, 1911) was an Italian professional football player.

Honours
 Serie A champion: 1934/35.

1911 births
Year of death missing
Italian footballers
Serie A players
A.C. Perugia Calcio players
Juventus F.C. players
Brescia Calcio players
Association football midfielders